Chimedbazaryn Damdinsharav (born March 21, 1945) is a retired Mongolian wrestler.

At the 1968 Summer Olympics he won the bronze medal in the men's Freestyle Flyweight category.

Awards 
 People's Teacher of Mongolia

Notes

References

External links
 

1945 births
Living people
People from Övörkhangai Province
Wrestlers at the 1964 Summer Olympics
Wrestlers at the 1968 Summer Olympics
Wrestlers at the 1972 Summer Olympics
Mongolian male sport wrestlers
Olympic wrestlers of Mongolia
Olympic bronze medalists for Mongolia
Olympic medalists in wrestling
Medalists at the 1968 Summer Olympics
People's Teacher of Mongolia
20th-century Mongolian people
21st-century Mongolian people